The Socialist Party of North America (SPNA) was a political party founded in 1911 and the first in North America to adopt the Object and Declaration of Principles of the Socialist Party of Great Britain (SPGB).

The party was formed when the Toronto local of the Socialist Party of Canada (SPC) seceded in protest over that party's reformism. Its members had been influenced by Moses Baritz, a SPGB member resident in Toronto.

The SPNA survived for a few years, but failed to grow and the party was eventually dissolved in 1914. Many of its members rejoined the SPC.

References 
 J. M. Milne: History of the Socialist Party of Canada. 1973
 Ian Angus: Canadian Bolsheviks. The Early Years Of The Communist Party Of Canada. Montreal 1981
 William Beeching, Phyllis Clarke: Yours in the struggle. Reminiscences of Tim Buck. Toronto 1977

External links 
 Manifesto of the Socialist Party of North America (1911).

Socialist Party of Canada breakaway groups
Former Companion Parties of the World Socialist Movement
Federal political parties in Canada
Socialist parties in Canada
Political parties established in 1911
Political parties disestablished in 1914
1911 establishments in Canada
1914 disestablishments in Canada